The black-rumped agouti (Dasyprocta prymnolopha) is an agouti species from the family Dasyproctidae. It is endemic to Brazil, and its range roughly equals the Northeast Region. It is named after its black rump which contrasts clearly with the orange body.

References

Dasyprocta
Mammals described in 1831